Jajarkot Palace is a historic place located in Jajarkot District, Karnali Province, Nepal.

The palace was built by the King of Jajarkot Hari Shah in 1825 (Bikram Sambat). The palace was originally seven storeys and was reduced to four storeys due to the 1934 Nepal–India earthquake. The April 2015 Nepal earthquake further damaged the building.

References

Historic sites in Nepal
Palaces in Nepal
Jajarkot District
18th-century establishments in Nepal
Buildings and structures in Jajarkot District